Pierre or Petrus De Brabandere (1828–1895) was the 21st bishop of Bruges in Belgium.

Life
De Brabandere was born in Ooigem, West Flanders, on 25 September 1828. He enrolled at the Major Seminary, Bruges, on 1 October 1848 and was ordained to the priesthood on 21 May 1853. He went on to study at the Catholic University of Leuven, graduating licentiate of canon law in 1857, after which he spent a year at the Belgian Pontifical College in Rome.

After returning to Belgium he briefly served in parish ministry in Ypres before being appointed professor of canon law at the seminary in Bruges in 1861. He wrote a manual of canon law that was a standard text for decades. He became the director of the seminary in 1869, and vicar general to Bishop Faict in 1880. He became a canon of Bruges Cathedral in 1885, and vicar capitular after Bishop Faict's death in January 1894. He was appointed Faict's successor as bishop of Bruges on 18 May 1894 and was consecrated as bishop on 11 June 1894. He died in Bruges on 31 March 1895, having been bishop for less than a year.

Publications
 Juris canonici et Juris canonico-civilis Compendium (Bruges, 1869), much reprinted to 1914.

References

1828 births
1895 deaths
People from West Flanders
Catholic University of Leuven (1834–1968) alumni
Bishops of Bruges
Canon law jurists